Bültzingslöwen is a German noble family. The family is part of the Uradel, or ancient nobility, of Thuringia.

History 
The family originated from Bilzingsleben in the Duchy of Thuringia. One of the first mentions of the Bültzingslöwen family is of Hermann von Bultzingslowen in 1212. On 29 June 1216 it was recorded that another family member, Rodolphus de Buscingheleiben, served as a witness on the family will of Hermann I, Landgrave of Thuringia. Members of the family served as chief bailiffs of Eichsfeld. In 1381 the Archbishop of Mainz confirmed ownership of Worbis and Harburg to Siegfried VIII von Bültzingslöwen.

Notable family members 
 , German military officer and geodesist
 , German merchant and Dutch Army consul in Surabaya
 Hendrik von Bültzingslöwen, German actor
 Isabelle von Bueltzingsloewen, French historian
 Johann Friedrich Christian von Bültzingslöwen, officer and recipient of the Pour le Mérite
 , German writer
 , Prussian major general
 , German doctor
 Mathilde von Bültzingslöwen, mother of Paula Modersohn-Becker

References

External links 
 Official family website

Von Bültzingslöwen family
German noble families
Noble families of the Holy Roman Empire
Thuringian nobility